Concept Searching Limited is a software company that specializes in information retrieval software. It has products for Enterprise search, Taxonomy Management and Statistical classification.

History
Concept Searching was founded in 2002 in the UK and now has offices in the USA and South Africa. In August 2003 the company introduced the idea of using Compound term processing.

Compound term processing allows statistical information retrieval applications to perform matching using multi-word concepts. This can improve the quality of search results and also allows unstructured information to be automatically classified with semantic metadata.

The company's products run on the Microsoft .NET platform. The products integrate with Microsoft SharePoint and many other platforms.

Concept Searching has developed the Smart Content Framework, which is a toolset that provides an enterprise framework to mitigate risk, automate processes, manage information, protect privacy, and address compliance issues. The Smart Content Framework is used by many large organizations including 23,000 users at the NASA Safety Center 

Concept Searching was acquired by Netwrix on 28 November 2018.

See also
 Compound term processing
 Enterprise search
 Full text search
 Information retrieval
 Concept Search

References

External links
Company Website

Knowledge management
Information retrieval organizations
Privately held companies of the United Kingdom
Software companies of the United Kingdom